Richard Milburn Academy is a charter high school in Daytona Beach, Florida.

History
Richard Milburn Academy was established in 2005 as a charter school under the management of education management organization Milburn Schools.

Milburn was designed to serve at-risk students.

Two other Richard Milburn middle schools in Volusia County were shut down in 2016.

References

Charter schools in Florida